These are the results of the 2019 Asian Wrestling Championships which took place between 23 and 28 April 2019 in Xi'an, China.

Men's freestyle

57 kg
23 April

61 kg
24 April

65 kg
23 April

70 kg
23 April

74 kg
24 April

 Batsuuriin Otgonbayar of Mongolia originally won the bronze medal, but was disqualified after he tested positive for 19-Norandrosterone at the 2019 Asian U23 Wrestling Championships one month before the competition. Adam Batirov was raised to third and took the bronze medal.

79 kg
23 April

86 kg
24 April

92 kg
24 April

97 kg
23 April

125 kg
24 April

Men's Greco-Roman

55 kg
27 April

60 kg
28 April

63 kg
27 April

67 kg
28 April

72 kg
28 April

77 kg
27 April

82 kg
28 April

87 kg
27 April

97 kg
28 April

130 kg
27 April

Women's freestyle

50 kg
25 April

53 kg
26 April

55 kg
25 April

57 kg
26 April

59 kg
25 April

62 kg
26 April

65 kg
26 April

68 kg
25 April

72 kg
26 April

76 kg
25 April

References

External links
Official website

2019 Results